Birgit Spångberg (1900-1937) was a Swedish lawyer. She was the first female judge in Sweden (1926).

References

Further reading 
  

1900 births
1937 deaths
20th-century Swedish judges
Swedish women lawyers
21st-century Swedish lawyers
20th-century Swedish lawyers
Swedish women judges
20th-century women lawyers
20th-century women judges
20th-century Swedish women